Albert Edward Carter (July 5, 1881 – August 8, 1964) was an American lawyer and politician who served ten terms as a Republican United States Representative from California from 1925 to 1945.

Early life and career 
Carter was born in Lemon Cove (sometimes spelled Lemoncove), in Tulare County, California. He attended the public schools and graduated from San Jose State Normal School in 1903, which is now San Jose State University. He taught school six years and then graduated from the law department of the University of California, Berkeley in 1913. He was admitted to the bar the same year and commenced practice in Oakland, California.

Carter was a representative of the United States War Department Commission on Training Camps from 1917 to 1919. He was an attorney for the California State Board of Pharmacy in 1920 and 1921 and commissioner of public works of Oakland 1921–1925 and in 1923 initiated the plan for a comprehensive development of the harbor on the east side of San Francisco Bay. He was the president of the Pacific Coast Association of Port Authorities.

Congress 
He was elected as a Republican to the Sixty-ninth and to the nine succeeding Congresses (March 4, 1925 – January 3, 1945). He was an unsuccessful candidate for reelection in 1944 to the Seventy-ninth Congress.

Later career and death
He resumed the practice of law in California and Washington, D.C. and died in Oakland, California, in 1964. He was buried in Home of Peace Cemetery, Porterville, California.

References

1881 births
1964 deaths
UC Berkeley School of Law alumni
Republican Party members of the United States House of Representatives from California
20th-century American politicians